Mobarak Hossain Khan (27 February 1938 – 24 November 2019) was a Bangladeshi musicologist, musician, and writer. He played the surbahar, a bass version of the sitar.

Background
Khan was born on 27 February 1938. He came from a musical background. His relatives include Ustad Dr. Alauddin Khan (his uncle), Ustad Ayet Ali Khan (his father), Ustad Dr. Ali Akbar Khan (his cousin), Srimati Annapurna Devi (his cousin), Pandit Ravi Shankar (Annapurna's husband of first marriage), Ustad Abed Hossain Khan (his eldest brother), Ustad Bahadur Khan (his elder brother), Sheikh Sadi Khan (his younger brother), his other cousins Ustad Khadem Hossain Khan, Ustad Mir Kashem Khan, his nephews Ustad Phuljhuri Khan, Ustad Khurshid Khan, Ustad Shahadat Hossain Khan, Ustad Bidyut Khan, Ustad Kirit Khan, Reenat Fauzia (his daughter), and many others. He was the third son of Ustad Ayet Ali Khan. His grandfather was Sabdar Hossain Khan (Sadu Khan), and other uncles include Samiruddin Khan, Fakir (Saint) Aftabuddin Khan, Ustad Nayeb Ali Khan.

Career and awards
Khan was the Director General of National Academy of Fine and Performing Arts (Bangladesh Shilpakala Academy) and former Chairman of Nazrul Institute named after the Poet-Laureate of Bangladesh Kazi Nazrul Islam. He was also the President of the Bangladesh Chapter of International Council for Traditional Music (ICTM), the headquarters being in the US and the President of Ustad Ayet Ali Khan Academy of Music. He also served Radio Bangladesh and former Radio Pakistan for a long stint of 30 years. He was also the secretary general of the International PEN Bangladesh Chapter, headquarters being in London, UK

He visited many countries including USA, U. K., China, Canada, Colombia, France, Germany, Japan, North Korea, Indonesia, Thailand, Hong Kong, Singapore, Spain, Kuwait, Iran, India, Pakistan, and Australia as a leader of cultural delegation, and also as an expert on radio, Saarc, Unesco, as well as on classical music.

Mobarak Hossain Khan and his wife Fauzia Khan were involved in planning, research and hosting a popular TV musical program on NTV, named Bajo ebong Bajao, which features Nazrul Sangeet with the sangat (co-performance) of sitar, sarod, and other classical instruments.

Academics
Khan was a visiting lecturer of College of Music, Dhaka, Bangladesh, and associated with the Department of Drama and Music of Dhaka University and Rajshahi University. He earned his M. A. in History from Dhaka University.

Books
Mobarak Hossain Khan wrote a total of 137 books, 3 of them are in English. He also contributed to the 'Banglapedia' (the National Encyclopedia of Bangladesh) published by the Asiatic Society of Bangladesh.

His three books on Music in English are:

 
 
 

Among his 137 books, 30 are original research books on Music in Bangla, and the 3 mentioned above are his original research books on Music in English. Besides, he has published 19 more books on Music for juveniles. He started with translations, and he had published 20 of them, and later he had translated 23 more books for Juveniles. There were 34 more books on Juvenile stories. He had published 2 novels and 2 autobiographical books. Another notable contribution is his 4 books on Bangladesh Liberation War.

Personal life
Khan was married to Fauzia Yasmin.  They had one daughter, Reenat Fauzia, and two sons, Dr. Tareef Hayat Khan, and Tanim Hayat Khan.

Honors and awards
 Ekushey Padak (1986)
 Independence Day Award (1994)
 Bangla Academy Literary Award (2002)
 Nazrul Gold Medal
 Moulana Akram Khan Gold Medal
 Atish Dipankar Gold Medal

Death
Khan died on 24 November 2019 at the age of 81.

References

Notes

External links
Mobarak Hossain Khan: Official Home page
 
 

1938 births
2019 deaths
20th-century Bangladeshi male singers
20th-century Bangladeshi singers
Surbahar players
Musicologists
Recipients of the Ekushey Padak
Recipients of the Independence Day Award
Recipients of Bangla Academy Award